Max Kruse may refer to:

 Max Kruse (born 1988), German footballer
 Max Kruse (Australian footballer) (born 1958), Australian footballer
 Max Kruse (author) (1921–2015), German author, known mostly for his children's books
 Max Kruse (sculptor) (1854–1942), German sculptor; father of the above